Uncle Martino is a 1960 Australian television play. It was directed by Christopher Muir from a play by Guido Cantini.

Premise
In an Italian village, a family is unsure if Uncle Martino is a millionaire or a pauper.

Cast
Don Crosby as Martino
Peter O'Shaughnessy as Salvi
Barbara Brandon as Ameila
Moira Carleton as Mansueta
Kira Daniels as Gina
Collins Hilton as Procaccia
Paul Karo as Silvio
Dennis Miller as Michel
Joy Mitchell as Viola
Ron Pinnell as Ghigo
Wyn Roberts as Trulla

Reception
The Sydney Morning Herald thought that the production "lacked the sheer relish in character-drawing and good humoured gusto that would have made it more than a rather laboured dissection of cupidity."

References

External links

Australian television plays
1960 television plays